Sodium perbromate is the chemical compound composed of the sodium ion and the perbromate ion, with the chemical formula NaBrO4.

Preparation

Sodium perbromate can be prepared by reacting sodium bromate with fluorine and sodium hydroxide:

References

 Sodium compounds
 Perbromates